The John and Murta Van Dellen House is a historic house located in The Dalles, Oregon, United States. Built in 1920, it is the outstanding example of a California bungalow in The Dalles. Original owner John Van Dellen was a prosperous lumber yard owner, and made use of the finest local building materials and craftsmanship in constructing his house.

The house was added to the National Register of Historic Places in 1991.

See also
National Register of Historic Places listings in Wasco County, Oregon

References

External links

Houses completed in 1920
National Register of Historic Places in Wasco County, Oregon
Houses on the National Register of Historic Places in Oregon
Houses in The Dalles, Oregon
Bungalow architecture in Oregon
1920 establishments in Oregon